Pandeli Xhaho (born 12 July 1955) is an Albanian footballer. He played in two matches for the Albania national football team in 1983.

References

External links
 

1955 births
Living people
Albanian footballers
Albania international footballers
Place of birth missing (living people)
Association footballers not categorized by position